Salman Khurshid Alam Khan (born 1 January 1953) is an Indian politician, designated senior advocate, eminent author and a law teacher. He was the Cabinet Minister of the Ministry of External Affairs. He belongs to the Indian National Congress. He is a lawyer, and a writer who has been elected from Farrukhabad Lok Sabha constituency in the General Election of 2009. He belongs to the Farrukhabad area. Prior to this he was elected to the 10th Lok Sabha (1991–1996) from the Farrukhabad Lok Sabha constituency. He became the Union Deputy Minister of Commerce in June 1991, and later became the Union Minister of State for External Affairs (Jan. 1993 – June 1996). He started his political career in 1981 as an Officer on Special Duty in the Prime Minister's Office (PMO) under the prime ministership of Indira Gandhi.

Early life and education

Born in Aligarh, Uttar Pradesh, he is the son of Khurshed Alam Khan a former Union Minister of External affairs, Government of India, and maternal grandson of Zakir Hussain, the third President of India. He is of Pathan descent maternally, tracing his ancestry to the Afridi  tribe.

He studied in St. Xavier's High School, Patna, Delhi Public School, Mathura Road. He obtained B.A. (English and Jurisprudence) from St. Stephen's College, Delhi and later did M.A., Bachelor of Civil Law at St Edmund Hall of  Oxford University. He also taught as lecturer in law at Trinity College, Oxford.

Political career
Salman started his political career as an Officer on Special Duty in the Prime Minister's Office, during the Prime Ministership of Indira Gandhi in the early 1980s. Later he became the Deputy Minister of Commerce in the Government of India. In 1991, he won the election to parliament from the Farrukhabad Lok Sabha constituency in Uttar Pradesh and was appointed Minister of State for External Affairs by Prime Minister Narasimha Rao. He lost the election of 1996 and it was not until 2009 that he returned to Parliament.

In the General Election of 2009, he was elected as Member of Parliament from Farrukhabad, winning as a candidate of the Indian National Congress, with 169,351 votes. He became the Union Minister of State (with Independent Charges) of Corporate Affairs and Minority Affairs in the Government of India. He took over as Minister on Friday, 29 May 2009. In the Cabinet reshuffle of 12 July 2011, he was made Cabinet Minister for Law and Justice, and for Minority Affairs, in the Government of India.

He came 4th and lost his deposit in the Lok Sabha elections 2014 contesting from the same constituency of Farrukhabad. In the next parliamentary election (2019), he stood 3rd in with 55,258 votes.

Political Offices
He has been the President of the Uttar Pradesh Congress Committee twice. He was also the President of the  Delhi Public School Society  and Dr. Zakir Hussain Study Circle and PATRON of Mother Teresa Memorial Trust/Mother Teresa Foundation.

Political Views
Salman Khurshid appeared for Students Islamic Movement of India, a group banned in India and frequently charged by Indian authorities with terrorist activities, as its defence lawyer, appealing the 2002 ban; in June 2006 the Supreme Court of India rejected the appeal noting "the appeal against the ban should be first argued before the tribunal established for the purposes". Asked about his appearance, Khurshid said :

I would refuse a client only when I am personally satisfied that taking up the case would go against the ethics of the profession. A lawyer has to appear for an accused. It is my constitutional duty. A party and the government too cannot pre-judge an organisation.

In 2009, Salman Khurshid criticized the partition of India, opining that a united India would have been better than a divided one.

In 2009, incumbent president Sirajuddin Qureshi beat Salman Khurshid for the presidency of India Islamic Cultural Centre. Campaign for the election was very intense which became high-profile with Khurshid's entry in the fray.

Writings
Khurshid has been deeply involved in writing and acting in plays since his student days in Delhi and Oxford. He is the author of the play Sons of Babur, published by Rupa & Co., which has been staged, with Tom Alter in the lead role, at the Red Fort in Delhi.

Salman Khurshid has also been the editor of "The Contemporary Conservative: Selected Writings of Dhiren Bhagat"  published in 1990.

In October 2021, Khurshid published Sunrise over Ayodhya: Nationhood in Our Times, writing about India's decline in secularism surrounding the Ayodhya dispute. BJP leaders shared an excerpt from the book and triggered a controversy regarding Khurshid's attempt to draw a parallel between Hindutva and radical Islamist groups. The controversy resulted in his Nainital home being vandalized and set on fire.

A suit filed by Hindu Sena President Vishu Gupta, wanting to stop the publication, circulation, and sale of the book Sunrise over Ayodhya was dismissed by a Delhi court on 18 November 2021.  The court said that the author and publisher had the right to write and publish the book.

Zakir Hussain Memorial Trust and Operation Dhritrashtra

Khurshid and his wife Louise run the Zakir Hussain Memorial Trust for physically challenged people. The trust was founded on 30 October 1986 and commemorates the third President of India, Zakir Hussain, who is the maternal grandfather of Salman Khurshid. The Zakir Hussain Memorial Trust is registered at Khurshid's residence as an NGO and Louise is its chief functionary officer. It has been operating in many states and receiving substantial grants from several important ministries of the government of India. , it is chaired by Sayeeda Alam, Khurshid's father. In October 2012, India Today and Aaj Tak alleged that the Khurshids had embezzled funds, a charge denied by them. The ruling party Congress strongly defended Khurshid, but former social activist Arvind Kejriwal of Aam Aadmi Party began what he called "indefinite agitation". Angered by the allegations, Khurshid called Arvind Kejriwal a 'guttersnipe'. About 7.1 million was allegedly used by Salman Khurshid which was funded by the government to buy tricycles for the disabled.

"Operation Dhritrashtra" was an investigation conducted by TV news channel Aaj Tak which alleged financial misappropriation by the trust. The investigation conducted by Deepak Sharma, Editor, SIT, India Today Group, revealed that it forged signatures and stamps of senior officials of several districts in Uttar Pradesh. Aaj Tak gathered documentary evidence of the alleged forgery and false reporting from at least ten districts in the state. The Uttar Pradesh Economic offence wing investigated the matter. Louise filed a defamation case against the TV Today news broadcaster, which had publicised the allegations.

References

External links

 Salman Khurshid, webpage at Lok Sabha website

|-

|-

|-

|-

1953 births
India MPs 1991–1996
India MPs 2009–2014
Alumni of St Edmund Hall, Oxford
Indian Muslims
Indian National Congress politicians
Living people
Lok Sabha members from Uttar Pradesh
Ministers for External Affairs of India
Law Ministers of India
Ministers of Minority Affairs
Members of the Cabinet of India
Politicians from Aligarh
St. Stephen's College, Delhi alumni
St. Xavier's Patna alumni
United Progressive Alliance candidates in the 2014 Indian general election
Delhi University alumni
People from Farrukhabad district
Indian people of Pashtun descent